The visual arts of Sudan encompass the historical and contemporary production of objects made by the inhabitants of today's Republic of the Sudan and specific to their respective cultures. This encompasses objects from cultural traditions of the region in North-East Africa historically referred to as the Sudan, including the southern regions that became independent as South Sudan in 2011. 

Throughout its history, Sudan has been a crossroads between central Africa, East Africa, Egypt, Mediterranean cultures, sub-Saharan Africa in the west and the Red Sea coast in the east of the country. Before the 20th century, these cultural traditions were influenced by indigenous African, Pharaonic, Greco-Roman, Byzantine and Arabic cultures that have brought about a large diversity of cultural expressions, often specific to the ethnic or social group that produced and used them. As expressions of the material culture of a society, applied arts and handicrafts are included with the fine arts in this history of the arts in Sudan.

Starting in the early 19th century, the establishment of first the Turkish-Egyptian and later the Anglo-Egyptian rule, characterised by foreign military and political domination, ushered in the gradual evolution of a modern nation state with new cultural influences on the lifestyles and material culture of the Sudanese.

After independence in 1956, Sudanese graduates of the colonial education system took over leading positions in the new state and thus contributed to the emergence of urban culture and modern art. These cultural developments became most visible from the 1950s to the 1980s, a period that was later called "The Making of the Modern Art Movement in Sudan".

In the 21st century, visual artistic developments in the country have been characterised by digital forms of communication, including audio-visual art spread and received through satellite television, online media as well as images and films shared through social media. During the Sudanese Revolution of 2018 and 2019, young artists contributed to the protests and morale of the popular movement, creating wall paintings, graffiti, cartoons, photographs or video messages.

Historical periods preceding contemporary Sudan

Prehistoric times 

The oldest existent objects of material artifacts in Nubia, such as stone tools, date back to prehistoric times. The Sabu-Jaddi rock art site is a unique cluster of more than 1600 rock drawings from different historical periods expanding for more than 6000 years through different eras of Nubian civilization. The well-preserved drawings represent wild and domestic animals, humans and boats and were included by the World Monuments Fund in its list of monuments to watch. Other ancient rock drawings were found in the arid valley known as Wadi Abu Dom in the Bayuda Desert. Another important prehistoric site was found in the border region between Sudan, Libya and Egypt in the Gabal El Uweinat mountain range. In Sudan's western region, the Jebel Mokram Group, characterized by its pottery and small clay figures of animals, was a prehistoric, neolithic culture that flourished in the second millennium BCE.

Kerma and the Kingdom of Kush 

From the Kerma culture (2500–1500 BCE), the seat of one of the earliest civilizations of ancient Africa, weapons, items of pottery and other household objects are presented in museums such as the National Museum of Sudan, the Kerma Museum, the British Museum or the Metropolitan Museum of Art.

During the Kingdom of Kush (about 950 BCE–CE 350), when the monarchs of Kush ruled their northern neighbour Egypt as pharaos for over a century, Nubian statues like the sphinx of Taharqa acquired Egyptian features and were erected in temples or Nubian pyramids, such as in Meroe, one of Sudan's World Heritage Sites. Among other resources, the material culture of ancient Nubia used gold, ivory, ebony, incense, hides or precious stones, and necklaces or bracelets have been found in tombs of royal families. Nubian kings and queens, the latter called Kandakes of Kush, were represented in stone reliefs on temples, like the one dedicated to Apedemak (The Lion Temple) at Naqa. Other examples of ancient Nubian architecture are rock-cut temples, mud-brick temples called deffufa, graves with stoned walls or dwellings made of mudbricks, wood and stone floors, palaces and well laid out roads.

Influences by Greco-Roman culture 

From the 3rd century BCE to the 3rd century CE, northern Nubia was invaded and annexed to Egypt, which was ruled by the Ptolemaic Kingdom and later the Roman empire. Cultural influences of this period as far south as in Nubia can be seen in the so-called 'Roman baths' in Meroe, an excavated building called "an outstanding example of cultural transfer between the African kingdom and the Greco-Roman culture of the Mediterranean."

Another example of cultural influence from Nubia during Ptolemaic rule in Egypt is a marble head of a Nubian young man, probably made in the Eastern Mediterranean Region, and now exhibited in the Brooklyn Museum in the US.

Medieval Nubia 
In medieval Nubia (c. 500–1500 CE), the inhabitants of the Christian kingdoms Makuria, Nobadia, and Alodia produced distinct forms of architecture, like the Faras Cathedral, sculptures, and wall paintings, of which more than 650 have been published in modern scholarly texts. These relate to the Coptic art of Egypt, and sometimes to Ethiopian art.  They used the Old Nubian language, Coptic, Greek or Arabic for different religious or secular texts, preserved on manuscripts or as inscriptions on sandstone, marble or terracotta.

Even though Muslim migrants, probably merchants and artisans, are confirmed to have settled in Lower Nubia from the 9th century onwards, the actual Islamization of Nubia began in the late 14th century.

Arrival of Islam and Arabization 

In the 16th and 17th centuries, new Islamic kingdoms were established – the Funj Sultanate and the Sultanate of Darfur, starting a long period of gradual Islamization and Arabization in Sudan. These sultanates and their societies existed until the Sudan was conquered by the Ottoman Egyptian invasion in 1820, and in the case of Darfur, even until 1916.
Major cultural changes of this period were marked by the adoption of the Islamic religion and growing use of the Arabic Language as elements of everyday life. Other cultural developments were reported by foreign visitors such as Frédéric Cailliaud and relate to the architecture of towns and mosques, the manufacture of weapons like throwing knives or kaskara swords – and the slave trade. In this period, schools for the Arabic language and for Islamic studies, called khalwa, were founded and Sufi brotherhoods took roots in Sudan. Examples of their material culture are a flag with the Islamic statement of faith, now in the British Museum, or a wooden tablet of the late 19th century, used as writing board for students learning the Quran, presented online by the Brooklyn Museum, New York City.

The 19th and 20th century until independence 
From the beginning of the 19th century onwards, drawings or photographs, taken by foreign visitors, constitute some of the earliest records for the traditional arts of different ethnic and social groups, such as architecture, dress, hairstyles, jewellery or scarifications.

After the first period of Turkish-Egyptian rule (1821–1885), the Mahdist State (1885–1899) left important traces in Omdurman, one of the three major areas of greater Khartoum. The tomb of the Mahdi, the Khalifa House, Mahdist coins and specific types of dress, like the jibba coat worn by the Mahdi's followers, bear witness to the cultural character of this period.

In the early 19th century, Egyptians, British and other foreign inhabitants of Khartoum had expanded the city from a military encampment to a town of hundreds of brick-built houses. And during the condominium of the Anglo-Egyptian Sudan (1899–1956), the British army and civil administration ushered in important changes in the society, economy and culture.

The British administration also introduced a Western system of education, with Gordon Memorial College for higher learning and Art Education in schools, and a School of Design opened in 1945.This is regarded as the start for the development of modern art in Sudan, and painting or sculpture in the Western sense began to take roots. Historian Heather J. Sharkey made the following comment on the influence of visual culture through the British educational system: "Photographs and pictures enabled the boys and Old boys of Gordon College to see and hence to imagine the world, the British Empire, and the Sudan in new ways, visual culture was as important to the development of nationalism as the culture of words." It was precisely in the emerging visual art of documentary films that Gadalla Gubara, said to have been the first Sudanese cameraman, was trained for the Colonial Film Unit.

To train teachers, especially for vocational training, an art course was introduced in the Institute of Education in 1943 and three years later, a School of Design was established. In 1951, this school was moved to the Khartoum Technical Institute, and in 1971, it became the Faculty of Fine and Applied Arts in the Sudan University of Science and Technology (SUSTECH). Despite considerable setbacks caused mainly by the neglect of several governments, it continues in 2021 and is the place where many of Sudan's modern visual artists and musicians have started their artistic education.

Traditional applied arts and crafts 

In accordance with contemporary notions of material culture of any social group, the terms traditional arts, folk arts, applied arts, crafts or handicrafts refer to a wide range of cultural objects made by humans. Apart from the so-called Fine Arts, this applies to such diverse Sudanese creations as textiles and dress, including the traditional galabiya, turbans and skullcaps for men or the veils and toub for women, jewellery, shoes and other kinds of leatherwork such as sandals, leather talismans containing sacred script, jewellery and other kinds of personal adornment, like henna ornaments on hands or ankles. Sudanese traditions of woodwork, pottery or metalcraft can be found in traditional furniture like the angareeb bedsteads, in earthenware vessels for drinking water placed outside private houses, as containers for burning incense or as traditional coffee pots called jabana.

In 2017, cultural anthropologist Griselda El Tayib published her book Regional Folk Costumes of the Sudan with illustrations of dress and other kinds of personal adornment from different ethnic groups of Sudan. Also, ethnic traditions of body art such as cicatrizations, hairstyles, like braids or the so-called fuzzy-wuzzy hairstyles of Hadendoa men, modern dreadlocks and make-up have been or still are in everyday use. On the same topic, The Grove Encyclopedia of Islamic Art and Architecture cautions that "By the 1990s many of Sudan's traditional arts were under threat from modernization and the importation of mass-produced goods."

20th-century modern art

The beginnings in the 1940s and up to the 1960s 
Referring to an early group of graphic artists and painters of the late 1940s in Khartoum, the overview on Modern art in Sudan, published in 2009 by scholars Werner Daum and Rashid Diab, mentions the Art of the Coffee Houses (fann al-maqāhi). These artists produced Sudanese motifs for product packaging and the first documented paintings on easels, and their artistic output is said to reflect the emerging urban society in the capital, with modern art replacing ethnic traditions limited to a specific tribal culture.

The decisive period for the emergence of the Khartoum School of Modern Art, however, started in the mid-1950s, when the first Sudanese figurative artists returned home after their postgraduate studies in England. Their work began to be recognized both at home and abroad, and became known as an important contribution towards the development of contemporary African art.

In their overview, Daum and Diab characterized modern Sudanese art as "vacillating between the affirmation of its own roots and Western influence. [...] The first movement tried to read Sudanese heritage and culture as the basic factor for artistic creativity, [...] influenced by the social condition of this particular Arab–Islamic–African culture. The next generation would adopt Western schools and styles in full, such as abstract painting, cubism or surrealism in a move to affirm the universality of art. The third trend could be considered a middle way between the two: the usage of Sudanese, Arab and African elements in a quest for identity without making direct allusions to them, but transforming and developing them in an innovative way."

Major exhibitions and collections 
In 1995, the Whitechapel Gallery in London presented the exhibition Seven Stories about Modern Art in Africa as part of the festival africa95. Clémentine Deliss, the main curator, stated that the exhibition invited "the audience to experience a small part of the conceptual and aesthetic manifestations of the visual arts in Africa during the second half of the twentieth century." This exhibition and the participation by curators and artists from Africa or the African diaspora were later judged as one of the most important events of the festival. Participating artists from Sudan were Mo Abarro, Rashid Diab, Kamala Ibrahim Ishaq, Abdel Basit El Khatim, Severino Matti, Hassan Musa, Amir Nour, Ibrahim El-Salahi and Osman Waqialla.

In 2016, the Sharjah Art Foundation, United Arab Emirates, presented a commemorative exhibition entitled The Khartoum School – The Making of the Modern Art Movement in Sudan (1945–present), including paintings, photographs and sculptures of Sudanese visual artists, such as paintings by Hussein Shariffe and Ibrahim El Salahi or photographs by Rashid Mahdi and Gadalla Gubara. Other artists representing the modernist movement in Sudan were Osman Waqialla, Bastawi Baghdadi, Ahmed Shibrain, Abdelrazig Abdelghaffar, Mohammad Omer Khalil, Tag el-Sir Ahmed, Mohamed El Hassan Abdel Rahim, called Shaigi, Siddig El Nigoumi, Magdoub Rabbah, Ahmed Hamid Al Arabi and Griselda El-Tayib. This retrospective show was complemented by two separate solo exhibitions, focusing on paintings by Kamala Ibrahim Ishaq and sculptures by Amir Nour.

On the occasion of the retrospective exhibition of works by Ibrahim el-Salahi in 2016, the Tate Modern art gallery in London called the Khartoum School "a modernist art movement formed in Sudan in 1960 that sought to develop a new visual vocabulary to reflect the distinctive identity of the newly independent nation."

The Barjeel Art Foundation in the United Arab Emirates presents Sudanese paintings by Abdel Qader Hassan, Kamala Ibrahim Ishaq, Mohammed Omar Khalil, Omar Khairy, Ibrahim El-Salahi, Hussein Shariffe, Ahmad Shibrain and graphic art by Khalid Albaih on their online page.

Individual artists 
Osman Waqialla (1925–2007) worked as painter and calligrapher. He graduated from the School of Design, Gordon Memorial College in Khartoum in 1945, and later continued his artistic studies in London and Cairo. His use of Arabic calligraphy as a modern, non-religious graphic form places Waqialla within the Arabic art movement that became known as the Hurufiyya movement. In the early 1960s, some of his students in Khartoum, such as Ahmad Mohammed Shibrain (b. 1931), Ibrahim el-Salahi (b. 1930) and Tag el-Sir Ahmed (b. 1933) joined Waqialla in creating the Sudanese art movement later to be called the 'Khartoum School of Modern Art'.

Griselda El Tayib (1928–2022) was a British-born art historian, art educator and visual artist, who is mainly known for her pioneering research and watercolour paintings of the traditional costumes, as they reflect the culture and society of Sudan since the 1970s. Referring to her long-standing contributions to the arts in Sudan, the authors of the article "Modern Art in Sudan" called her "a Sudanese artist of British origin".

Ibrahim el-Salahi (b. 1930) has become known for the widest international recognition for any painter from Sudan. He is considered to be one of the foremost members of the Khartoum School of African Modernism and the Hurufiyya art movement, which sought to combine traditional forms of Islamic calligraphy with contemporary art. In 2016, the Tate Modern art gallery in London presented the exhibition Ibrahim El-Salahi: a visionary modernist with 100 works, spanning more than fifty years of the artist's international career. It called El-Salahi "one of the most significant figures in African and Arab Modernism", setting his work in the context of the global history of art.

Ahmed Shibrain (b. 1931) studied at the College of Fine and Applied Arts in Khartoum and then at the Central School of Arts and Design in London, specializing in graphic design. After his return to Sudan in 1960, he established a department for Graphic Design at the College of Fine and Applied Arts, where he also acted as dean. Shibrain became known for his modern forms of calligraphy in his paintings and is considered part of the hurufiyya movement, as well as one of the artists of the 'School of Khartoum'.

Siddiq El Nigoumi (1931–1996), created artistic pottery. Educated first in Sudan, he lived in the United Kingdom from 1967 onwards. In his burnished terracotta earthenware, he combined European and African influences. The Victoria and Albert Museum in London holds some of his works, with his ibreeq, a modern version of a traditional Sudanese coffee pot, presented online.

Hussein Shariffe (1934–2005), a painter, poet, filmmaker and lecturer at the Faculty of Arts of the University of Khartoum, was a Sudanese intellectual and artist, active from the late 1950s to the 1990s. After his studies of Modern History at the University of Cambridge in England, he took a Master's degree at London's Slade School of Fine Arts, where he studied under Lucian Freud. Along with other works, his painting Angel Pregnant with Moon, was exhibited in London's Gallery One in 1960, and the National Portrait Gallery in London holds photographs by Shariffe sitting in front of his paintings. Shariffe is said to have painted more than 500 paintings, but only few of them have been documented.

Mo Abarro (1935–2016), born as Mohammed Ahmed Abdalla Abarro, was a sculptor known for his ceramic art. As other artists of his generation, he graduated from the College of Fine and Applied Arts in Khartoum and then studied ceramics at the Central School of Arts and Crafts in London. After his postgraduate studies in industrial pottery design, he returned to Sudan to teach ceramics for some years, but decided to return to England in 1966 to pursue his career in Britain. His work was described as both reflecting traditional Sudanese domes and arches, as well as the shapes of calabashes and basketry.

Kamala Ibrahim Ishaq (b. 1936), the first modern woman painter in the Sudan, studied painting at the College of Fine Arts of the Sudan University of Science and Technology in Khartoum and later at the Royal College of Art in London. Together with her students Muhammad Hamid Shaddad and Nayla El Tayib, she was a founder of the conceptual art group called the "Crystalists" that brought new directions to Sudanese art. According to the Sharjah Art Foundation, her work "challenges the traditional male perspective of art in Sudan, depicting scenes of women's lives in colours of sun, sand and sky."

Mohammad Omar Khalil (b. 1936) studied Fine Arts in Khartoum until 1959 and from 1963, painting and printmaking in Florence, Italy. Working and teaching for several decades in the United States since 1967, he has used found objects, archival materials, textiles, or photographs, beside conventional paints. In his prints, he prefers different shades of black, as he explained on the occasion of his exhibition Homeland Under My Nails at London's Mosaic Rooms in 2020. Khalil has been called "one of the Arab world's most important contemporary painters, having influenced two generations of regional artists." In 2012, his work was presented in the retrospective exhibition at the Institut du Monde Arabe in Paris.

Amir Nour (1939–2021), a sculptor and academic, studied African art and sculpture at the University of St. Andrews, Scotland, the Royal College of Art, London, U.K. and the School of Art & Architecture of Yale University, United States. His sculptures, made of materials like concrete, fibreglass or steel, are abstract and minimal, but still citing animals, landscape, and architecture that relate to Sudan and the Afro-Islamic culture of his youth.

Omer Khairy (1939–1999) started studying art as his major subject in secondary school and from 1960, he continued at the College of Fine and Applied Arts. Due to mental health problems, he had to interrupt his studies. Nevertheless, he became known for his paintings in local exhibitions, that have since been presented in public collections. Sudanese filmmaker Alyaa Musa has been engaged in a documentary film project about this "mystery, even for those who surrounded his timid presence and his audacious artwork."

Hassan Musa (b.1951), who left Sudan for postgraduate studies in France in the 1970s, is known as painter, calligrapher, engraver and has illustrated numerous books. During the 1960s, he engaged in the popular genre of Mail art, also known as Post Art, associated with anti-establishment activity. His work 'The Martyrdom of Saint Sebastian' was included in the exhibition 'Modernities and Memories' at the 1997 Venice Biennale. For his adaptations of classical Western masterpieces, he is said to have created "a critical view on Western art, politics and culture."

Rashid Diab (born 1957) studied painting and art history first in Khartoum and continued his postgraduate studies at the Complutense University in Madrid, Spain. The works of his early period created in Spain have been described as abstract, strong images, reflecting the colours and texture of his native country. Upon his return to Sudan, he responded to the different ways of interpretation by his local audience and turned to more recognizable forms of expression, like women set "in absolute nothingness". Diab's works have been internationally exhibited, and some are presented online by the Hindiyeh Museum of Art in Jordan.

Salah El Mur (born 1966) is internationally known as painter, graphic designer, book author and filmmaker. His paintings show influences from tradition, folklore, different people and environments, and his use of colour shows bold tones in broad lines. He lives and works between Cairo and Khartoum and his paintings have been shown in exhibitions both in the Middle East, Europe and the United States. In 2018, his paintings were presented along with works by Kamala Ishaq and Ibrahim El-Salahi by Saatchi Gallery, London, in an exhibition called Forests and Spirits: figurative art from the Khartoum School.

Ahmed Abushariaa (b. 1966) graduated from the College of Fine and Applied Arts in 1990 and lived in Kenya in the mid-90s. He later briefly lived in Cologne, Germany, and since 2000, he has been living in Kampala, Uganda, where he continues to work and exhibit his paintings. His style is said to be influenced by the earlier contemporary artists in Sudan, including Ibrahim el Salahi and Rashid Diab.

Apart from the names already mentioned, other Sudanese artists of the 20th century in the Smithsonian Libraries reading list on Modern African Art are Musa Khalifa (born 1941), Mohamed Omer Bushara (born 1946), and Salih Abdou Mashamoun (born 1946).

The 21st century and the art of the revolution 

As Sudanese academic Ahmad Sikainga wrote in 2012, modern art movements in Sudan and their social background have not attracted much analysis by art historians. During the Sudanese Revolution of 2018/19, however, the role of artists has been reported in international media, reflecting their interest in current events. Before and during the revolution, artists expressed their views on society and politics, even though this expression had been severely limited by the former government of Omar al Bashir. In November 2020, students of the College of Fine Arts at Sudan University of Science and Technology (SUSTEC) exhibited a memorial sculpture representing the slogans of the Revolution: Freedom, Peace And Justice. In April 2021, further art exhibitions took place in Khartoum to commemorate the revolution and protestors killed during the revolution.

Khalid Albaih, a political cartoonist and human rights activist, acquired fame through his Facebook page Khartoon! as well as his interviews in Middle Eastern and Western media. In 2019, he co-edited the illustrated book "Sudan retold". Using different artistic genres, such as graphic storytelling, watercolour painting or photography, a group of young artists told their versions of Sudanese history, present and future. Amna Elhassan, one of these young artists featured, has since embarked on an international career, with a solo exhibition in 2022 at the renowned Schirn art museum in Frankfurt, Germany.

Referring both to the important role of women in the Sudanese Revolution as well as to the artistic works of women artists, their contributions have been highlighted in articles, exhibitions and public artistic performances.

Art galleries and patronage 
In 2009, the article on Modern Art in Sudan stated that "artists in Khartoum have been severely hampered by the lack of exhibition space, and by the lack of patronage." It mentioned only one 'semi-public' art gallery in Khartoum, and the occasional exhibition at one of the bigger hotels. Rather, it gave credit to the "major role" played by the three foreign cultural centres of Great Britain, France and Germany. Besides these, private galleries had been opened by Sudanese artists Ahmad Muhammad Shibrain and Rashid Diab. Diab's art centre also was the place, where the work of Ibrahim El-Salahi, living in exile since 1978, was presented in 2000 to the Sudanese art world. Another gallery promoting Sudanese artists in Khartoum has been the Dabanga Gallery, whose owner Lina Haggar edited the book Contemporary artists of the Sudan: art in times of adversity in 2017. In 2016, Mojo Art Gallery was one of the few commercial art spaces presenting Sudanese art. Until 2022, a number of other art galleries such as Downtown Art Gallery were operating in Khartoum.

Comics and cartoons as popular art forms 
Popular art forms such as cartoons and comics, published in print or online, also have found growing attention and respond to current events, such as the international COVID-19 pandemic. Since 2018, a festival for comics, called Khartoum Comic Con, has been organized as a showcase for Sudanese comic artists and their audience.

Cinema and photography in Sudan 

Foreign explorers and photographers have created drawings and photographs from the middle of the 19th century onwards. In the 20th century, photo stories about the Nuba people in the southern part of Sudan taken by photographers George Rodger and Leni Riefenstahl, as well as by photojournalists covering human crises have shaped the international image of the country. At the start of the 21st century, the introduction of digital photography initiated a wider photographic and artistic coverage by Sudanese photographers.

After film production and cinemas in Sudan started in British colonial times during the first half of the 20th century, Sudanese audiences in Khartoum and other cities had been exposed to documentary and feature films from abroad, and since the 1930s, there were a number of outdoor cinemas. After independence, few films were produced by the first generation of Sudanese filmmakers such as Gadalla Gubara or Hussein Shariffe. In 2019, the biographies of three Sudanese filmmakers of the 1960s were presented in the documentary film Talking About Trees, which also shares personal insights into the reasons for the decline of cinemas and filmmaking in Sudan.

See also 

History of Sudan
Architecture of Sudan

Notes

References

Bibliography 

Ali, Wijdan (1997). Modern Islamic Art: Development and Continuity. Gainesville, FL: University Press of Florida. 

Daum, Werner and Rashid Diab (2009). Modern Art in Sudan In Hopkins, Peter G. (ed.) Kenana Handbook of Sudan. New York: Routledge, pp. 453–516 
 Ducommun, Janine Andrée and Hesham Elshazly (2009). Kerma and the royal cache. 
El Tayib, Griselda et al. (2017). Regional Folk Costumes of the Sudan. Kaufering: Sequenz Medien.  

Haggar, Lina and Tarneem Saeed. Contemporary artists of the Sudan: art in times of adversity / edited by Victor Röhm; photographer Issam Hafiez. Khartoum, Sudan: Dabanga Art & Crafts, 2015. 141 pp. with colour illustr. 
 Hassan, Salah (ed.) (2012). Ibrahim El-Salahi – A Visionary Modernist, Museum for African Art, New York , exhibition catalogue online

Kennedy, Jean. "Desert light: Sudan," pp. 108–122. In New currents, ancient rivers: contemporary African artists in a generation of change. Washington, DC: Smithsonian Institution Press, 1992.
Muhammad, Baqie Badawi, "Arts: Visual Arts and Artists: Sudan", in: Encyclopedia of Women & Islamic Cultures, General Editor Suad Joseph.
Porter, Venetia. Word into Art: Artists of the Modern Middle East. British Museum Press, 2006 
Sharkey, Heather J. (2003) Living with Colonialism: Nationalism and Culture in the Anglo-Egyptian Sudan. Berkeley and Los Angeles, University of California Press. 
"Sudan, Democratic Republic of the." In The Grove encyclopedia of Islamic art and architecture. Eds. Jonathan M. Bloom, Sheila S. Blair. Oxford Islamic Studies Online.

External links 

Sudan, Egypt and Nubia on the webpages of the British Museum
In the land of Kush, illustrated article about material culture in Sudan from Smithsonian Magazine
Portrait of Sudanese painter Ibrahim El Salahi on Google Arts & Culture 
Article with photographs about Amir Nour: Balance, Patterns, Rhythms. 2016 
20th-century paintings from Sudan on Google Arts & Culture
Paintings and artistic pottery by the Khartoum School on Sudan Memory
Paintings by Sudanese artists in the Barjeel Art Foundation
Sudan retold – A look into an illustrated book of artistic storytelling by Sudanese contemporary artists
How Art Helped Propel Sudan's Revolution magazine article about artists active in the Sudanese Revolution

Sudan
Arts in Sudan
Images of Sudan
History of Sudan
Society of Sudan
Sudanese culture